is a former professional Nippon Professional Baseball player.

External links
 

1980 births
Hokkaido Nippon-Ham Fighters players
Japanese baseball coaches
Japanese baseball players
Living people
Nippon Professional Baseball coaches
Nippon Professional Baseball outfielders
Orix Buffaloes players
Saitama Seibu Lions players
Seibu Lions players
Baseball people from Kagoshima Prefecture